Inspector Pratap is a 1988 Telugu-language action film, produced by Y. Anilbabu under the Krishna Chitra banner and directed by Muthyala Subbaiah. It stars Nandamuri Balakrishna, Vijayashanti  and music composed by Chakravarthy. The film was recorded as a Hit at the box office.

Plot
The film begins in a town where a spirited cop Pratap is a newly deputed one that swears to protect the integrity & sovereignty of the nation. Pratap is brought up by his elder brother Ramanatham who stands as an artful Advocate. Yet, he reveres him & sister-in-law Janaki and dotes on their kid Baby. As of today, Pratap takes charge when he is acquainted and darlings a plucky girl Chukka that runs a tea stall opposite his station. Besides, Viswaroopam is malignant and undertakes malpractice as rectitude. Pratap always antagonizes him, and the battle erupts. Once, he red-handedly apprehends Raakhi son of Viswaroopam who conducts misdeeds by his father's stature. However, he escapes with the fake alibis created by Ramanatham when a rift arises between the siblings. 

Simultaneously, Kranti & his faction of rebels take up arms against Viswaroopam. But he counterfeits them for his crimes as dacoits. Now Pratap has charged to grab them. Meanwhile, Viswaroopam ruses by clutching Ramanatham as his business ally and fixes his Baby's alliance with Raakhi. As a result, Pratap quits the house along with Janaki & Baby because they opposed it. Following, Pratap catches hold of Kranti, when he is startled to be aware Chukka is his sister. Plus, Kranti & men are not-guilty, the actual owl is Viswaroopam. Thus, Pratap lock-ups them, in his custody to get the truth. Whereupon, Janaki showers concern, and affection on them. After a while, Pratap ascertains the actuality and associates them with him. 

Parallelly, Janaki becomes terminally ill and must be quickly operated for which a tidy sum is compulsory. Pratap denies Ramanatham's aid and gains the amount by endangering his life. Anyhow, tragically, Baby is molested by Raakhi when Ramanatham freaks out on knaves and he is kicked out. Accordingly, he attempts suicide when Pratap bars, boosts up his courage, and mingles him. All of them issue an ultimatum to Viswaroopam, step-by-step, collapse his domain. Further, Pratap publicly uncovers the diabolic shade of Viswaroopam and proves Kranti innocent. At last, he ceases the baddies. Finally, the movie ends with the government honoring Inspector Pratap with The Gold Medal.

Cast

Nandamuri Balakrishna as Inspector Pratap 
Vijayashanti as Chukka
Satyanaryana as Viswarupam
Jaggayya as Commissioner
Gollapudi Maruthi Rao as Lawyer Ramanatham
Rallapalli as Narahari
Giri Babu as Murahari
Sarath Babu as Kranthi
Narra Venkateswara Rao as C.I.
Chalapathi Rao as Pakir
Nizhalgal Ravi as Ramki
Prasad Babu as Prasad
P. J. Sarma as I.G.
Bhemiswara Rao as Jaganatham
Suthi Velu as Constable Rangaiah
Potti Prasad 
Chitti Babu
Ramana Reddy 
CH Krishna Murthy as Constable
Eeswar Rao 
Vidyasagar
Srividya as Janaki
Varalakshmi as Baby
Mucharlla Aruna 
Y. Vijaya

Soundtrack

The music was composed by Chakravarthy. The music was released on LEO Audio Company.

References

1988 films
Films scored by K. Chakravarthy
1980s Telugu-language films
Films directed by Muthyala Subbaiah